Millbourne may refer to:
 Millbourne, Pennsylvania: a borough in Delaware County, Pennsylvania, United States
 Millbourne, Edmonton: a community within Mill Woods in the City of Edmonton, Alberta, Canada

See also 

 Milbourne (disambiguation)